The Warrant Officer of the Royal Air Force (WORAF) (previously known as the Chief of the Air Staff’s Warrant Officer) is the senior RAF appointment for a warrant officer (WO), and therefore the most senior non-commissioned appointment in the Royal Air Force (RAF). The person holding this military appointment advises the Chief of the Air Staff (CAS) on matters concerning airmen and airwomen of the RAF. The post was created in 1996 as the Chief of the Air Staff’s Warrant Officer.
The post was re-titled Warrant Officer of the Royal Air Force (WORAF) on 1 July 2021.

List of holders

The Royal Navy equivalent is the Warrant Officer to the Royal Navy (WORN), and in the Royal Marines the Corps Regimental Sergeant Major.  The British Army's recent equivalent is the Army Sergeant Major.

See also
Chief Master Sergeant of the Air Force — United States Air Force (USAF) equivalent
Sergeant Major of the Air Force — South African Air Force (SAAF) equivalent
Warrant Officer of the Air Force — Royal Australian Air Force (RAAF) equivalent

References

Royal Air Force appointments
 
Warrant officers